The Mixed relay event of the Biathlon World Championships 2015 was held on 5 March 2015.

Results
The race was started at 18:15 EET.

References

Mixed relay
Mixed sports competitions